Max Green (1952 – 25 March 1998) was an Australian lawyer who embezzled millions of dollars and was later murdered in Cambodia.

Early life
He was born in London, England and moved to Australia when he was 5 and grew up in Sydney. He graduated from law school, moved to Melbourne and married Louise Giselle Baron in 1976.

He joined the board of Emma Page, a fashion jewellery concern, in 1981. He spent the years from 1985 to 1989 in Austin, Texas, working full-time for Emma Page.

In 1991, Green became a partner of Gary Vernon Shugg, in a law firm in Melbourne.  Green left this firm in late 1993.  In 1995, a partner of the firm (Shugg) was suspended from practice for three years. It was alleged, but never proved, that the firm sold weapons to Cambodia. The firm was placed into receivership in June 1994 at the request of Shugg.

Green became a partner in Melbourne law firm Aroni Colman shortly after his departure from Shugg & Green.

Tax minimisation
Australian tax law allows equipment purchases that are below a certain purchase price to be entirely depreciated in the first year. Green founded an investment scheme during the 1990s designed to help investors minimise tax legally. The scheme would buy equipment and lease it to CityLink for the construction of highways in Melbourne.

The scheme involved borrowing four times as much money as the initial capital from a Hong Kong bank. A$42 million was invested in the scheme, mainly by private individuals. Most of the investors were Jewish businessmen from Melbourne. Green promised a 15% per annum return on investment, as well as allowing investors to legally write off some of the investment as a tax deduction.

Green created fraudulent documents that appeared to show equipment purchases, but the fund never actually purchased any equipment and CityLink did not lease any equipment from it. A considerable quantity of money disappeared from the trust accounts used to hold the investors' capital. The movement of the money was subsequently traced through an elaborate network of bank accounts.

However, Green ultimately laundered all the money that he stole and police were never able to recover any of it. It is thought that he purchased some US $20 million of gems from various gem traders in Cambodia, and later sold the gems in Israel.

The Victorian Lawyers RPA Ltd, the regulatory arm of the Victorian Law Institute, began an investigation of "trust account irregularities" in accounts associated with Green and Aroni Colman.

Quotes
His friend and associate Ted Doyle, a gem trader, said "A very fine piece of monofilament was attaching Max Green to the planet. You are talking about a very sick soul who played with the wrong people… In the course of trade, Max got killed before he could pay his last bill. It makes it rather difficult for people to pay their bills. Not breathing affects your ability to write checks."

References

Law Institute of Victoria, "Cambodian murder: trust account irregularities under investigation," 27 March 1998
Richard W. Hughes. "Love & Hate: Sapphire of Laos: Max Green, Ted Doyle, Kerry Danes & the Stolen Millions"

1952 births
1998 deaths
20th-century Australian lawyers
Australian people murdered abroad
People murdered in Cambodia
Deaths by strangulation
Criminals from Melbourne